Anson Lo Hon-ting (born 7 July 1995) is a Hong Kong singer, dancer and actor. In 2018, Anson Lo made his debut as a member of the Hong Kong boy group Mirror. Anson Lo made his solo debut in February 2020 with his first single "A Lifelong Mission" (一所懸命). In 2021, he won the Best New Asian Artist Award at the 2021 Mnet Asian Music Awards.

Early life 
Anson Lo was born on 7 July 1995 in Hong Kong. He has one older sister. Lo attended Shak Chung Shan Memorial Catholic Primary School and Po Leung Kuk Lo Kit Sing (1983) College. He went on to study a Bachelor of Business Administration (Business Analysis) at the City University of Hong Kong. Lo dropped out in his third year of university to pursue a career as a dance instructor.

Career

2018–present: Mirror 

Prior to his debut, Lo was a dance instructor and a backup dancer. He has been a backup dancer for Aaron Kwok, Kelly Chen and Coco Lee. In 2018, he was persuaded by ViuTV producer Ahfa Wong to audition for the reality television talent competition Good Night Show – King Maker, of which Wong was the producer. Lo was directly promoted to the second round (top 55) as one of the five winners of 'Eye Catching Idol' through fan vote. He was eliminated in the fourth round, making the top 30.

On 3 November 2018, Lo made his debut as a member of boy music group, Mirror, at a press conference with their debut single "In a Second" (一秒間). His position is the main lead dancer, main English rapper and sub-vocalist. His fans are known as "Sonto" (Plural: Sontos) (神徒).

On 5 July 2019, Lo released the promotional single "B.M.G. (Be My Girl)" with Mirror member Keung To.

In King Maker II, Lo won the Professional Competitor Award.

2020–present: Solo activities 
On 29 February 2020, Lo made his solo debut with his first single "A Lifelong Mission" (一所懸命). Lo penned the lyrics to his second single, "Burn Out", released on 12 August 2020. His third single "Corner Creatures" (角落生物) was released on 14 October 2020. Lo made his acting debut in the 2020 youth sport television drama series We are the Littles as Bobby Chan Yat-long (陳逸朗). The drama also featured Lo's fourth single "Teammate" (神隊友) as the interlude song. At the 2020 Ultimate Song Chart Awards Presentation, Lo won the Best Newcomer Bronze Award. He also won the Best New Artist Gold Award at the 43rd RTHK Top 10 Gold Song Awards in January 2021.

His fifth single "EGO" was released on 5 February 2021. In June 2021, Lo gained widespread recognition and skyrocketed in popularity starring as Ling Siu-muk (凌少牧) in the Hong Kong adaptation of Japanese romantic comedy drama Ossan's Love. On 7 July 2021, Lo released his sixth single, "Unlovable Leader" (不可愛教主), which also served as the ending theme song of Ossan's Love. The music video for "Unlovable Leader" surpassed 10 million views in four months. In September 2021, Lo made a guest appearance in the Taiwanese drama Sometimes When We Touch as Cheng Yat-fei (鄭一飛), and also sang the ending theme song with Keung To. On 22 September 2021, Lo released his seventh single, "Megahit", which later became his first single to top three Hong Kong mainstream music charts and was awarded Ultimate Song No.9 at the 2021 Ultimate Song Chart Awards Presentation and Best Song of the Year at the Chill Club Music Awards 21/22. A remix version, "Megahit Megamix", with rap lyrics penned by Lo was also released on 1 December 2021. On 25 November 2021, Lo made his official film debut as Lui Tsz-ging (雷紫荊) in Showbiz Spy, which made the top ten highest grossing films in Hong Kong in 2021. On 7 and 8 December, Lo along with Mirror members, Keung To, Edan Lui, Ian Chan, Anson Kong, and Jer Lau headlined concert "MOOV LIVE Music on the Road". On 11 December 2021, Lo won the Best New Asian Artist Award (Mandarin) at the renowned 2021 Mnet Asian Music Awards (MAMA), marking his first time to receive international recognition.      

On 25 February 2022, Lo released his eighth single, "Mr. Stranger". On 8 June 2022, he released his ninth single, "King Kong", for which he also directed the music video for the first time. On 12 November 2022, Lo released his tenth single, named "39 Wing Shun Street" (永順街39號), which is his primary school address, to convey a story about puppy love. On 13 November 2022, Lo and singer Joyce Cheng, headlined the 903 Music is Live Concert, titled 神の拉闊. In December, Lo starred in drama series Million Dollar Family as Ng Ziu-ming (吳照明), and also sang the theme song. At the 2022 Ultimate Song Chart Awards Presentation, Lo won the coveted My Favourite Male Singer Award for the first time.            

On 20 January 2023, Lo was invited by Universal Music Hong Kong to participate in the project《REMEMBERING LESLIE》, to mark the 20th anniversary of Hong Kong icon, Leslie Cheung's death, he covered Cheung's original song, "An Affair" (偷情). On 22 February 2023, Lo released the single, "MONEY".

Discography

Singles

As lead artist

Collaborations

Filmography

Television series

Variety show

Film

MV Appearances

Awards and nominations

References

External links 
 
 
 

1995 births
Living people
Cantopop singers
Hong Kong male singers
21st-century Hong Kong male singers
Hong Kong male film actors
Hong Kong television personalities
Hong Kong male television actors
Hong_Kong_idols
King Maker contestants
Mirror (group) members
Alumni of the City University of Hong Kong
MAMA Award winners